is a 2003 Japanese film directed by Genjiro Arato. It is based on the novel of the same name by  that was serialized in Bungakukai from November 1996 to October 1998.

Awards and nominations
46th Blue Ribbon Awards
 Won: Best Film
 Won: Best Actress - Shinobu Terajima
 Won: Best Supporting Actress - Michiyo Okusu
28th Hochi Film Award 
 Won: Best Actress - Shinobu Terajima

References

2003 films
Films about suicide
Films directed by Genjiro Arato
Japanese drama films
2000s Japanese-language films
2000s Japanese films